Amplicella is a genus of extinct hymenopteran.

References

Ichneumonidae